Bente Hansen (born 22 August 1953) is a Norwegian gymnast. She competed at the 1972 Summer Olympics.

References

External links
 

1953 births
Living people
Norwegian female artistic gymnasts
Olympic gymnasts of Norway
Gymnasts at the 1972 Summer Olympics
Sportspeople from Oslo
20th-century Norwegian women